Johann Sebastian Bach composed the church cantata  (I call to You, Lord Jesus Christ), 177. He wrote the chorale cantata in Leipzig for the fourth Sunday after Trinity and first performed it on 6 July 1732. The cantata text is formed by the unchanged five stanzas of Johann Agricola's hymn.

History and words 

The prescribed readings for the Sunday were from the Epistle to the Romans, "For the earnest expectation of the creature waiteth for the manifestation of the sons of God", and from the Sermon on the Mount in the Gospel of Luke: the admonition to "be merciful", "judge not". The cantata text is formed by the unchanged five stanzas of Johann Agricola's chorale (ca. 1530), a main hymn for the Sunday, used also in Bach's cantata , written in Weimar. In , also composed to complete the second annual cycle of chorale cantatas, Bach also used the unchanged words of the chorale, different from the cantatas originally composed for the cycle.

Bach first performed the cantata on 6 July 1732.

Scoring and structure 
The cantata in five movement is scored for three soloists (soprano, alto and tenor), a four-part choir, two oboes, two oboes da caccia, two violins, viola, basso continuo, an obbligato violin and an obbligato bassoon.

 Chorus: 
 Versus 2 (alto): 
 Versus 3 (soprano): 
 Versus 4 (tenor): 
 Versus 5 (chorale):

Music 
Similar to most chorale cantatas, the opening chorus is a chorale fantasia, presenting the chorale line by line, the cantus firmus here sung by the soprano. Most of the lines are preceded by entries of the other voices in imitation of motifs independent of the chorale melody. In line 6 the imitation motive is taken from the chorale. In the two last lines 8 and 9 the lower voices enter together with the soprano. The vocal structure is embedded in a concerto of solo violin and two oboes which play the cantus firmus  colla parte with the soprano, strings and continuo.

The three arias for the following verses show increasing instrumental complexity. Verse 2 is accompanied by continuo only, verse 3 by oboe da caccia, verse 4 by the rare combination of violin and bassoon. The musicologist Julian Mincham observes a "journey from uncertainty and doubt to warmth and acceptance and finally to rejoicing and jubilation".

In the finale chorale Bach used ornamentation for expressiveness.

Recordings 
The listing is taken from the selection on the Bach Cantatas Website.

 Die Bach Kantate Vol. 41, Helmuth Rilling, Gächinger Kantorei, Bach-Collegium Stuttgart, Arleen Augér, Julia Hamari, Peter Schreier, Hänssler 1981
 J. S. Bach: Das Kantatenwerk – Sacred Cantatas Vol. 9, Nikolaus Harnoncourt, Tölzer Knabenchor, Concentus Musicus Wien, soloists of the Tölzer Knabenchor, Kurt Equiluz, Teldec 1988
 Bach Cantatas Vol. 3, John Eliot Gardiner, Monteverdi Choir, English Baroque Soloists, Magdalena Kožená, Nathalie Stutzmann, Paul Agnew, conductor Soli Deo Gloria 2000
 J. S. Bach: Complete Cantatas Vol. 21, Ton Koopman, Amsterdam Baroque Orchestra & Choir, Sandrine Piau, Bogna Bartosz, Christoph Prégardien, Antoine Marchand 2003
 J. S. Bach: Cantatas for the Complete Liturgical Year Vol. 2, Sigiswald Kuijken, La Petite Bande, Siri Thornhill, Petra Noskaiová, Christoph Genz, Accent 2005

See also 
 Ich ruf zu dir, Herr Jesu Christ, BWV 639.  This work is a chorale prelude which Bach included in the Orgelbüchlein.

References

Sources 
 
 Ich ruf zu dir, Herr Jesu Christ BWV 177; BC A 103 / Chorale cantata (4th Sunday after Trinity), Bach Digital
 BWV 177 Ich ruf zu dir, Herr Jesu Christ English translation, University of Vermont
 BWV 177 Ich ruf zu dir, Herr Jesu Christ text, scoring, University of Alberta
 
 Luke Dahn: BWV 177.5 bach-chorales.com

Church cantatas by Johann Sebastian Bach
1732 compositions
Chorale cantatas